Villastellone is a comune (municipality) in the Metropolitan City of Turin in the Italian region Piedmont, located about 15 km south of Turin.

Villastellone borders the following municipalities: Moncalieri, Cambiano, Santena, Poirino, Carignano, and Carmagnola. It is home to a "castle", a Baroque villa attributed to Filippo Juvarra built on a pre-existing medieval fortification starting from 1735.

References

Cities and towns in Piedmont